Philip William Mayfield (born 7 November 1937 in Williams Lake, British Columbia) is a retired politician who was a member of the House of Commons of Canada from 1993 to 2004. He was previously a minister in the United Church of Canada.

Mayfield was elected in Cariboo—Chilcotin electoral district for the Reform Party in 1993. He was re-elected in 1997 and 2000 thus serving in the 35th, 36th and 37th Canadian Parliaments.

He retired from politics in 2004 after completing his third term in federal office.

References

External links
 

1937 births
Living people
Canadian Alliance MPs
Ministers of the United Church of Canada
Conservative Party of Canada MPs
Members of the House of Commons of Canada from British Columbia
Reform Party of Canada MPs
21st-century Canadian politicians